Garngad railway station was a railway station in Royston, Glasgow on the City Union Line, on the Garngad chord. It closed for passenger traffic in 1910.

The station opened on 1 October 1883. It was known as Blochairn station until 1885, when it was renamed to Garngad. The station closed on 1 March 1910. It was operated by the North British Railway. Passenger trains still operate through the station site to and from Springburn, the line having been AC electrified since 1960.

References

Disused railway stations in Glasgow
Former North British Railway stations
Railway stations in Great Britain opened in 1883
Railway stations in Great Britain closed in 1910
1883 establishments in Scotland
1910 disestablishments in Scotland